Sizwe Nxasana (born 7 August 1957) is a South African business executive , educator & chartered accountant. 

Professional Summary [1]    

He is the founder and CEO of Future Nation Schools and Sifiso Learning Group. He is the chairman of Ikusasa Student Financial Aid Programme (ISFAP) which funds and supports students pursuing occupations in critical skills from ’missing middle’ backgrounds. Nxasana was the CEO of the FirstRand Banking Group for 10 years and before that the CEO of Telkom SA for 8 years.   

He is the director of the Solidarity Fund and chairs the Fundraising Committee. Sizwe is also a member of South African Institute of Chartered Accountants.

He founded Sizwe & Co, KwaZulu-Natal’s first black audit firm, in 1989, and in 1996 he became the founding partner of Nkonki Sizwe Ntsaluba, now SizweNtsalubaGobodo (SNG Grant Thornton). He is the co-founder and chairman of the National Education Collaboration Trust (NECT) as a response to the call by the National Development Plan (NDP) for increased collaboration among stakeholders to improve educational outcomes. He was the chairperson of NSFAS between 2015 and 2018.  Civil Society Work [2]Mr Nxasana is one of the founding members of the Association for the Advancement of Black Accountants ( ABASA ) and served as its initial chairperson of its KwaZulu-Natal Branch as well as the organisations president from 1995 until 1998.

Nxasana was cited as one of the Top 100 most influential Africans by New African magazine in 2016.Education [3]
He holds a BCom Accounting degree from the University of Fort Hare and a BCom Accounting Science honours degree from the University of South Africa (UNISA) and was one of the first 10 African CA's in South Africa. He also holds a post graduate certificate in education from UNISA.

Sizwe Nxasana has been conferred with honorary doctorates by the Universities of Fort Hare, the Durban University of Technology, the University of Johannesburg and the Walter Sisulu University.

Personal life [4]
He is married to Dr Judy Dlamini and they have two children. Unfortunately their son , Sfiso, is deceased.

References

1957 births
University of Fort Hare alumni
University of South Africa alumni
South African businesspeople
Living people

2. https://abasa.org.za/leadership/

3. https://youtube.com/gBwzaVlTvos